Ellerslie is a historic home located at Port Tobacco, Charles County, Maryland, United States. It is a two-story frame house of basic Georgian styling, with two exterior chimneys at each end. It was possibly built as early as the mid 18th century, and was extensively altered and enlarged about 1790–1820. A porch was added in 1965. It is the birthplace of Daniel of St. Thomas Jenifer, a Founding Father of the United States and signer of the United States Constitution.

Ellerslie was listed on the National Register of Historic Places in 1979.

References

External links
, including photo from 1978, at Maryland Historical Trust

Houses completed in 1820
Houses in Charles County, Maryland
Houses on the National Register of Historic Places in Maryland
Georgian architecture in Maryland
Stone family residences
National Register of Historic Places in Charles County, Maryland
Jenifer family
Homes of United States Founding Fathers